Shirts and Skins may refer to:

 Shirts versus skins, a common phrase denoting team affiliations in an informal sports game.
 Shirts & Skins, a reality television series about gay basketball players.